Cardiff's town walls were a Medieval defensive wall enclosing much of the present day centre of Cardiff, the capital city of Wales, which included Cardiff Castle.

It had five town gates and was first mentioned in the year 1111. Sections of the wall collapsed in the 18th century due to neglect, and many stones were then used as building material for other buildings in the town. The last large section of the wall was demolished in 1901. Now there are only two sections of the Medieval wall that still remain. One section of the wall supports a flower bed to the east of Cardiff Castle on Kingsway, and the second, larger section forms the rear of a shop on Queen Street in an unmarked alleyway immediately on the other side of Kingsway, between the Northgate Building and One Kingsway.

History of the wall

The wall was constructed by Robert Fitzhamon the Lord of Glamorgan, and was first mentioned in 1111 by Caradoc of Llancarfan in his book Brut y Tywysogion (Chronicle of the Princes). By 1184, Maurice de Berkeley had built wooden palisades with South, North, East and West Gates. Gilbert de Clare later strengthened the defences of Cardiff Castle and the wooden palisades were replaced by stone walls.

In 1404, forces of Owain Glyndŵr, the last native Prince of Wales, destroyed much of the wall by the West Gate. It may have been that the town was completely burnt down except for the Grey Friary outside the East Gate. In 1451, a charter granted by Richard Neville, 16th Earl of Warwick, mentioned that Cardiff had been re-fortified, with new walls, towers, gates and ditches. A century later John Leland, in his Itinerary of 1536–39, described Cardiff as having a wall with five gates.

During the 16th century travelling writers described Cardiff's town wall as being intact, and it began to deteriorate around 1550 to 1560. In 1607 and 1703 Cardiff flooded, caused by a high tide and heavy rain, which would have caused damage to the west wall.

From the 18th century, the deterioration of the town wall progressed rapidly. It collapsed in sections due to neglect, and stones were then used as building material for other structures. It had become common practice for sections of the wall to be leased to burgesses (freemen of the town), which increased the rate of decline of the wall still further. Some of the wall was used to support the Glamorganshire Canal embankment.

In 1890, one of the last surviving sections of the wall was photographed (image right) at the rear of an old infant school in The Hayes. In 1901, this section was demolished to make way for the Cardiff fish market, which is now 9-11 The Hayes.

History of the gates

It has been recorded that the town wall included six gates; north, west, south, Gulley or Golate, Blaunch and west. However, there is little evidence to indicate that Golate or Gulley Gate was a proper gate instead of just a breach in a section of the wall that had already been ruined by flooding. By the end of the 18th century, all the gates in Cardiff's town wall were demolished. From John Speed's plan of Cardiff in 1610, the Golate was not shown, therefore, it seems likely that Cardiff only ever had five proper town gates.

The North Gate was also known as Senghennydd Gate or Sentry Gate. This was the main gate for travellers heading north to Senghennydd and Caerphilly. Its location spanned the present day Kingssway to the right of Cardiff Castle. It was illustrated several times by Paul Sandby between 1775 and 1776. Not long after Sandby's print was published in 1786, the North Gate was demolished to make room for the increasing traffic and the Glamorganshire Canal as recorded by Cardiff Council minutes 5 May 1786.

The East Gate was known only by one name, Porth Crockerton (Crockerton Gate). The gate spanned Crockherbtown Street, now known as Queen Street, for travellers heading east to Llanrumney and Newport. It already stood when, in 1171, William Fitz Robert, Earl of Gloucester, the Lord of Glamorgan, mentioned it as the eastern boundary of the borough. It has been assumed that it may already have been a stone structure in 1171, while the rest of the walls were still made from wood. John Speed's 1610 plan (above) depicts the gate having a single arch, yet other accounts suggest that the gate may have had three arches. In a Cardiff Council meeting of 20 September 1791, it was decided that the East Gate should be demolished.

The South Gate was mentioned in 1536 when John Leland referred to this gate as Portllongey, which means Shipsgate. Locally it was known as Moor Gate because it led to Soundry or South Town and onto moorlands, today known as Butetown. The only evidence of this gate comes from John Speed's plan and the indication of the location on later maps. The gate stood where today the Great Western Hotel stands. The final mention of the South Gate comes from a Cardiff Council meeting of 1802 when it was decided to demolish the gate and parts of the wall.

There are no details known as to when Blaunch (or Blunch) Gate was actually built. It was not in the original palisade town wall in the 12th and 13th centuries. It seems likely that this gate was added when the town walls were rebuilt in the 15th century. In 1542, it was recorded as Blounts Yate, but before that it was known as Wales Gate. Later the name changed to Blaunch or Blounts Gate, named after the keeper of the gate. Nothing else is known about it. It is not shown on John Speed's plan or on a later drawing of 1678. It was later recorded in the Court of Bailiffs on 28 January 1785, that it was "Ordered that the gate near the Quay called the Blunch or Blount Gate be taken out"

The West Gate was also known as Millgate or Myllegate, although Rice Merrick referred to the gate as Miskin Gate. The West Gate was first recorded in 1184, when it was still a timber building. The gate was demolished after 20 September 1781 according to Cardiff Council minutes.

Cock's Tower, also known as Cokes Towre, and Cox's Tower, was a watchtower which stood on the east wall, on The Hayes. Some remains of it may still be traced. It stood on the bend of a moat, until about 1860, when it was demolished. Cock's Tower was situated on the site of St Davids shopping centre. When Oxford Arcade was demolished to make way for St Davids shopping centre, archaeologists tried to find remains of the town wall, as well as Cock's Tower, which was a medieval watchpost and dungeon until around the 16th century. Cock's Tower was demolished about 1860 and its foundations were destroyed in 1962.

Present day

The only remaining example of a Cardiff town gate is the reconstructed West Gate attached to Cardiff Castle reconstructed by the Bute family, which was constructed in 1860, on the approximate site of the old West Gate, this building is now a Grade II* listed building. It was restored in 1921, probably to its original size and dimensions.

It previously had a blue plaque attached to it. A blue plaque of the North Gate still remains on the Northgate Building close by. Another smaller section of the wall supports a flower bed next to Cardiff Castle.

Other connections with the town wall that still exist include the thoroughfares Westgate Street and Golate, plus the thoroughfare in St Davids shopping centre called the Town Wall and the Northgate Building, close to the original North Gate. St Davids shopping centre had been built on a boundary of the town wall. So when Oxford Arcade was demolished to make way for St Davids shopping centre, archaeologists tried to find remains of the town wall, as well as Cock's Tower, which was a medieval watchpost and dungeon until around the 16th century.

See also
List of town walls in England and Wales
Timeline of Cardiff history
History of Cardiff

Notes

Further reading

External links
 
 Herbert E. Roese (1998), Medieval Cardiff "http://web.onetel.net.uk/~herbertroese/Medievalcardiff.html"

History of Cardiff
City walls in the United Kingdom